Seppo Myllylä (born 9 August 1958) is a Finnish judoka. He competed at the 1980 Summer Olympics and the 1984 Summer Olympics.

References

External links
 

1958 births
Living people
Finnish male judoka
Olympic judoka of Finland
Judoka at the 1980 Summer Olympics
Judoka at the 1984 Summer Olympics
People from Orivesi
Sportspeople from Pirkanmaa